Kozel is a surname literally meaning he-goat in some Slavic languages.
 Ben Kozel (born 1973), Australian adventurer, author and film maker
 Chet Kozel, American football player
István Kozel
 Luboš Kozel (born 1971), Czech football player
Roman Kozel
Yevgeniy Kozel

See also

Kozioł (surname)
Kozlov (surname)